Enda K. Hogan (born 1958) is an Irish former hurler. At club level he played with Kilruane MacDonaghs and was also a member of the Tipperary senior hurling team.

Career

Hogan first played hurling at juvenile and underage levels with the Kilruane MacDonaghs club. He was part of the club's under-21 team that won four consecutive Tipperary U21AHC titles. Hogan was at midfield on the Kilruane MacDonaghs team that won the All-Ireland Club Championship title in 1986, having earlier won four Tipperary SHC titles.

Hogan first appeared on the inter-county scene as a member of the Tipperary minor hurling team. He was an unused substitute when Tipperary beat Kilkenny by 16 points in the 1976 All-Ireland minor final. Hogan later won consecutive All-Ireland U21HC titles with the Tipperary under-21 team in 1978 and 1979. He joined the senior team in 1981 and made a number of appearances during the 1983 Munster SHC campaign.

Honours

Kilruane MacDonaghs
All-Ireland Senior Club Hurling Championship: 1986
Munster Senior Club Hurling Championship: 1985
Tipperary Senior Hurling Championship: 1977, 1978, 1979, 1985

Tipperary
All-Ireland Under-21 Hurling Championship: 1978, 1979
Munster Under-21 Hurling Championship: 1978, 1979
All-Ireland Minor Hurling Championship: 1976
Munster Minor Hurling Championship: 1976

References

External link

 Enda Hogan player profile

1958 births
Living people
Kilruane MacDonaghs hurlers
Tipperary inter-county hurlers